The Indore Open ATP Challenger was a tennis tournament held in Indore, India. The event was part of the ATP Challenger Tour and was played on hard courts. It was only played in 2014.

Past finals

Singles

Doubles

 
ATP Challenger Tour
Tennis tournaments in India
Hard court tennis tournaments
Sport in Indore
2014 in Indian tennis
2014 in tennis